Nohur refers to name of a settlement in Turkmenistan.

Nohur may also refer to:
 Nohur Lake in Azerbaijan 
 Nohur village in Iran in Sistan and Baluchistan province, Iran